Kurdish Shahnameh or Kurdish Shanama is a collection of epic poems that has been passed from mouth to mouth, as part of Kurdish oral tradition. In popular culture, the collection and writing of Shahnama in Gorani is attributed to the Kurdish poet Sarhang Almas Khan in the eighteenth century, but in reality many writers have gathered and written down the text of Shahnama in different locations and times. In fact, older and more recent manuscripts of the Kurdish Shahnameh are available. There are several differences between the Kurdish Shahnameh and Ferdowsi's Shahnameh, notably the poems of the former are written in Kurdish rather than Persian and there are several characters that are not mentioned in Ferdowsi's Shahnameh. Furthermore, the meter of Kurdish Shahnama is syllabic, which is more common in the Kurdish literature. Shahram Nazeri has sung several verses of the Kurdish Shahnameh in Avaze Asatir.

References

Kurdish literature
Historical poems
Kurdish books